Creepin' Thru Da Hoodz is a live album released on March 24, 1994 by the Washington, D.C.-based go-go band Junk Yard Band.  The album consists of nine tracks, including the songs "Heavy One", "John Wayne" and "Loose Booty".

Track listing

A Side
"John Wayne" – 8:04
"Loose Booty" – 4:59
"Let It Ride Socket Beat" – 9:14
"Clap to the Beat" – 6:16
"Block-Block"/"One Leg Up"/"Let the Beat Go"/"Uh-Oh"  – 9:49

B Side
"Beef Jerky Time" – 5:29
"Ruff-It-Off" – 8:16
"Ruff-It-Off" – 4:52
"Heavy One" – 4:19

References

External links
Creepin Thru Da Hoodz at Discogs
Creepin Thru Da Hoodz at ARTISTdirect

1994 live albums
Junk Yard Band albums